Dionaea muscipula 'Sawtooth' is a cultivar of Dionaea muscipula, the Venus flytrap that has deeply divided "teeth". It was formally described and registered as a cultivar in 2000.

References

External links
Photo gallery

Dionaea cultivars